Marie A. Hicks (December 20, 1923 – April 19, 2007) was an African-American activist during the American civil rights movement. Nicknamed "the Rosa Parks of Girard College," she is best known for leading thousands of pickets around the wall of that academic institution during the mid-1960s. Her efforts led to her sons being enrolled in the formerly all-white school in 1968.

Formative years
Born in Harlem, New York on December 20, 1923, Hicks married Junius Fletcher Hicks (1921–1964), who served with the United States Army during World War II. She moved with him during the 1960s to a section of North Philadelphia near Girard College. Walled off from the community, the college was only open for admissions at that time to white students who were fatherless.

Civil Rights work
As the mother of two boys who were unable to benefit from educational offerings at their neighborhood college due to its race-based admissions policies, Hicks became an advocate for her sons, Charles and Theodore, and then an activist for her entire community, state and nation during the American Civil Rights movement. Hicks led thousands of pickets at Girard College, in Philadelphia, Pennsylvania, to raise awareness of the institution's practice of denying students admission based on their race. Among those joining her in those protests were Martin Luther King Jr. and Cecil B. Moore.

In addition to protesting and organizing, Hicks also sued the college. As a result, the school was integrated. Two of the first four African-American students were her sons, Charles and Theodore Hicks. Theodore ultimately became the school's first black valedictorian. As the school's student body continued to diversify, the college finally admitted its first female student during the 1980s.

Later years
During the 1970s, Marie Hicks obtained employment as a maid at La Salle University, and began attending night classes there. In 1980, she was awarded a bachelor's degree in sociology from that institution.

While writing for Philadelphia's Scoop newspaper, she interviewed and worked with homeless women. She remained active well into her later life, working with senior citizens as a volunteer for Center in the Park’s Intergenerational Programs.

Illness, death and interment
Diagnosed with Parkinson's disease, Hicks died aged 83 from complications related to her condition on April 19, 2007, in Germantown, Pennsylvania. She was buried next to her husband at the Beverly National Cemetery in Burlington, New Jersey.

References

External links
 Kativa, Hilary S. "What: The Desegregation of Girard College." Philadelphia, Pennsylvania: Temple University Libraries, retrieved online July 16, 2019.
 Mikula, Jo. "The Desegregation of Girard College." Philadelphia, Pennsylvania: Historical Society of Pennsylvania, September 11, 2018.
 Murphy, Darryl C. "Girard College celebrates the 50th anniversary of its integration." Philadelphia, Pennsylvania: WHYY, September 12, 2018.

1923 births
2007 deaths
Deaths from Parkinson's disease
Neurological disease deaths in Pennsylvania
La Salle University alumni
African-American activists
Activists for African-American civil rights
People from Harlem
Activists from New York City
Burials at Beverly National Cemetery
20th-century African-American women
Women civil rights activists
21st-century African-American people
21st-century African-American women